The Limassol Crusaders are an independent rugby union club based in Limassol, Cyprus. They were the 2nd independent rugby club to be formed in Cyprus, after the Paphos Tigers. They were established in late 2003.

History

The club was formed, and initial membership recruited, by word of mouth after the 2003 Rugby World Cup. Temporary training facilities were used initially, including a spell at the Elias Beach Resort Hotel, until the club finally leased the AEK Achileas Stadium in 2004, with the club joining the Joint Services Rugby Football Union and competing formally starting with the 2004/05 season. When the Cyprus Rugby Federation formed its own league, Limassol Crusaders joined it.

When, in 2006, Cyprus formed a national squad, five Crusaders were members of the team that won their inaugural game against Greece.

In 2013, the Crusaders moved to a new stadium in the Mesa Geitonia area of Limassol. The new stadium has a higher capacity, better drainage and conforms better to IRB safety regulations.
In 2016, the club moved back to the historical stadium next to Katholiki Technical School after closing the contract with the previous venue.

Results

League

Tournaments

Tours

a Match played in the 2015 Warsaw Rugby Festival.

Current squad

2015/16

Internationally capped players

  Andrew Spring
  Panayiotis Jacovides
  Scott Lennox
  Dan McFarlane
  Constantinos Constantinides
  Artemis Papageorgiou
  Solomone Tuipulotu

Internationally capped former players
  Marco Mladenovic
  Fidias Efthimiou
  Kiki Vatikiotis
  Dimitri Maratheftis
  George Stylianou
  Dervis Devren
  Nathan Pring
  Greg Loucaides
  Chris Christofi
  Kostas Christou
  Peter Hunter
  Panayiotis Loizides
  Will Booth
  Stevie Awah
  Andy Webster

Captains
 2004/05  Zeno Nicolaou
 2005/06  Zeno Nicolaou
 2006/07  Chris Snaith
 2007/08  Andrew Spring
 2008/09  Darryl Davies
 2009/10  Greg Loucaides
 2010/11  Andrew Spring -  Marko Mladenovic
 2011/12  Fraser Nelson
 2012/13  Fraser Nelson
 2013/14  Constantinos Constantinides
 2014/15  Constantinos Constantinides
 2015/16  Constantinos Constantinides
 2016/17  Constantinos Constantinides
 2017/18  Constantinos Constantinides
 2018/19  Constantinos Constantinides

Youth rugby

As well as the senior team, the Crusaders also encourage youth rugby. The Crusader Colts is open to boys and girls aged 13 and older and the Minicru is open to children aged 6 and older.

Veterans rugby

In November 2016 the Limassol Crusaders for the first time fulfil a Veterans squad as opposition for the Camberley Rugby Vets  on tour in Cyprus. The team has been unofficially called "the Commandarias".

References

External links
 Limassol Crusaders RFC
Cyprus Rugby Federation

Rugby union in Cyprus
Cypriot rugby union teams
Sport in Limassol